Abdullah Yusuf Mayouf (born 3 December 1953) is a Kuwaiti football defender who played for Kuwait in the 1982 FIFA World Cup. He also played for Kazma Sporting Club. and a he also former deputy in the Kuwaiti National Assembly.

References

External links
FIFA profile

1953 births
Kuwaiti footballers
Kuwait international footballers
Association football defenders
1976 AFC Asian Cup players
1982 FIFA World Cup players
Living people
Kazma SC players
Members of the National Assembly (Kuwait)
Kuwait Premier League players